David Christopher Newell (born June 9, 1971) is an American judge, who serves on the Texas Court of Criminal Appeals. A resident of Houston, Newell was elected to the court in 2014 to succeed the retiring Place 9 Judge Cathy Cochran.

Newell graduated from the University of Houston in 1993, and from the University of Texas School of Law in Austin in 1997.

References

1971 births
Living people
University of Houston alumni
University of Texas School of Law alumni
Texas Republicans
Texas lawyers
Judges of the Texas Court of Criminal Appeals
People from Houston